Malesia may refer to:
 Malesia, the biogeographical region straddling the Indomalayan and Australasian realms
 Malesia (moth), a moth genus
 Malësi e Madhe District, one of the thirty-six political districts of Albania
 Malesia, Albania, a geographical region in northern Albania and eastern central Montenegro 
 , a geographical region in Montenegro and Albania
 Malesia, North Macedonia, a geographical region in North Macedonia

See also 
 Malesija (disambiguation)